Mt. Vernon is an unincorporated community in Putnam County, West Virginia, United States. It is part of the census-designated place of Teays Valley.

The community is centered on the intersection of Teays Valley Road and Mt. Vernon/Poplar Fork Road.

Unincorporated communities in Putnam County, West Virginia
Unincorporated communities in West Virginia
Charleston, West Virginia metropolitan area